Smogorzewo  is a village in the administrative district of Gmina Łabiszyn, within Żnin County, Kuyavian-Pomeranian Voivodeship, in north-central Poland.

The village has a population of 150.

History
During the German occupation of Poland (World War II), Smogorzewo was one of the sites of executions of Poles, carried out by the Germans in 1939 as part of the Intelligenzaktion.

References

Villages in Żnin County